Nepa is a genus belonging to the family Nepidae, known as water scorpions. There are six species found in freshwater habitats in the Northern Hemisphere.

They are oval-bodied, aquatic insects with raptorial front legs. Like other members of the Nepidae, they have a pair of nonretractable cerci-like breathing tubes on the terminal abdominal segment, a characteristic which readily distinguishes them from the Belostomatidae. Their primary staples are other insects and small aquatic vertebrates. They can inflict a painful bite when handled.

Etymology
'Nepa' is a classical Latin word for a 'scorpion' or 'crab'.

Species

The following species are included in Nepa:
 Nepa anophthalma Decu et al., 1994 (see Movile Cave)
 Nepa apiculata Uhler, 1862
 Nepa cinerea Linnaeus, 1758 - type species
 Nepa dollfusi Esaki, 1928
 Nepa grandis Linnæus, 1758
 Nepa hoffmanni Esaki, 1925
 Nepa monteilsensis Nel, 1988
 Nepa plana Sulzer, 1776
 Nepa remyi Poisson, 1961
 Nepa rubra Linnaeus, 1758
 Nepa rustica Fabricius, 1775
 Nepa sardiniensis Hungerford, 1928
 Nepa seurati Bergevin, 1926

Among these, N. apiculata of eastern North American (Canada and United States), and N. cinerea of Europe, northern Africa and northern Asia, are widespread. The remaining have restricted ranges in Corsica, Sardinia, Romania, Morocco and northeastern Asia. One of these, N. anophthalma, is the only cave-adapted species in the family Nepidae, found in Movile Cave.

Linnaeus listed a number of additional species in his description of the genus, most of which either are considered synonyms or have been moved to other genera.

References

External links

 Nepa on bugguide.net

Nepidae
Nepomorpha genera